A Captain's Courage is a 1926 American silent drama film directed by Louis Chaudet and starring Edward Earle, Dorothy Dwan and Lafe McKee.

Cast
 Edward Earle
 Dorothy Dwan
 Lafe McKee
 Ashton Dearholt 
 Jack Henderson
 Al Ferguson

References

Bibliography
 Munden, Kenneth White. The American Film Institute Catalog of Motion Pictures Produced in the United States, Part 1. University of California Press, 1997.

External links

1926 films
1926 drama films
Silent American drama films
Films directed by Louis Chaudet
American silent feature films
1920s English-language films
Rayart Pictures films
American black-and-white films
1920s American films